Acharya Nyima Tsering was a Tibetan writer and a translator from Tibetan to English.

Biography 
Nyima Tsering (1963–10 February 2011) graduated from the Central Institute of Higher Tibetan Studies in Sarnath, Varanasi, where he attained the degree of Acharya (Master of Philosophy) degree in 1993.

He conducted research on Buddhist Philosophy, worked as a translator of Buddhist teachings for international student groups, and lectured at universities and other institutions in the US and India. 
He also participated in seminars, gave workshops and lectures organized by Tibetan government and non government organizations. 
In addition, he published translations and his own commentaries on major Buddhist teachings, and authored scholarly articles, romantic and patriotic poems in English and Hindi.

Nyima Tsering died on 10 February 2011, in Dharamsala (India).

Publications

Translation 
 Commentary on the Thirty Seven Practices of a Boddhisattva, by the 14th Dalai Lama, Paljor Publications, 2002,  ;  Vyvyan Cayley, Mike Gilmore, Library of Tibetan Works and Archives, 1995
 The Lotus Garden's Play, by Patrul Rinpoche, Ed Vidhyadhara, 2006,   (Free download here)
 The Way of Living,  by Patrul Rinpoche, Ed Vidhyadhara, 2010,   (Free download here)
 Mulamadhayamika Karika, by the 14th Dalai Lama

Books 
 Essence of Mind Training, Paljor Publications, 2002, 
The Wisdom's Light

References

External links 
Author website

2011 deaths
Scholars of Buddhism from Tibet
Buddhist translators
Buddhist acharyas
Tibetan Buddhism writers
Tibetan Buddhists from Tibet
Contemporary Tibetan philosophers
Tibetan writers
Tibetan–English translators
21st-century translators
20th-century translators